Betashares is an Australian provider of exchange-traded funds (ETFs) and other ASX-traded funds. The company introduced a range of products into the Australian ETF landscape, including Australia's first currency hedged ETF, Australia's first range of commodity ETFs, Australia's first range of currency ETFs, Australia's first ETF using fundamentally based indexes and a range of short exchange traded products. Betashares is based in Sydney, Australia with offices in Melbourne and Brisbane.

Betashares is owned and managed by its Australian based management team and has a strategic shareholding from TA Associates, a US Private Equity firm. Up until March 8th, 2021, Betashares was partly owned by Mirae Asset Financial Group.

History 

Currently, Betashares offers exchange-traded funds across several asset classes, including equities, cash, fixed income, hybrids, currencies and commodities.

The organisation is actively involved in researching and commenting on ETF investing for Australian investors as well as forecasting the future growth of the industry in Australia.

Some of Betashares' milestones include:
 Announced the launch of Australia's first currency ETF covering the US Dollar and several months later the British Pound and Euro.
 Announced the launch of Australia's first currency hedged ETF, the Betashares Gold Bullion ETF.
 Announced the launch of Australia's first range of commodity ETFs, including Australia's first crude oil ETF.
 Announced the launch of Australia's first Cash ETF, the Betashares Australian High Interest Cash ETF, and subsequently launched the first ETF in Australia to offer exposure to a portfolio of Australian Bank senior floating rate bonds. In May 2018, they also launched a Corporate Bond ETF and in July 2019, an Australian Government bond ETF
 Announced the launch of Betashares Europe ETF (Currency hedged) and Betashares Japan ETF (Currency Hedged).
 Announced the launch of Australia's first ETF products using leverage and shorting over a range of asset classes, including Australian and global shares, as well as currencies offering exposure to both bullish and bearish investment strategies.
 Announced the launch of Australia's first ETF to track the NASDAQ-100 Index and the first ETF in Australia providing dedicated exposure to the global cybersecurity sector.
 Announced the launch of two ethical ETFs using climate leadership and ESG screening criteria, the Betashares Global Sustainability Leaders ETF Betashares Australian Sustainability Leaders ETF.
 Announced the launch of the world's lowest cost Australian equities ETF.
 Announced the launch of two new technology funds, the Global Robotics and Artificial Intelligence ETF and the Asia Technology Tigers ETF.
 Announced the launch of two new global funds, the Global Quality Leaders ETF and the Global Income Leaders ETF.
 Announced the launch of Australia's first ETF to track the FTSE-100 Index.
 Announced the launch of three low-cost ethical diversified portfolio ETFs (and ) and one low-cost all equity diversified portfolio ETF.
 Announced the launch of Australia's first ETF to track the new S&P/ASX All Technology Index.
 Announced the launch of Australia's first ETF in the cloud computing space which tracks the Indxx Global Cloud Computing Index.

Partnerships 
Betashares has formed a number of partnerships:

 In July 2013, Betashares launched the Betashares FTSE RAFI Australia 200 ETF, based on a fundamentally based index developed by Research Affiliates, a globally renowned product development and research firm. The Research Affiliates Fundamental Index® (RAFI) approach uses 4 fundamental factors to develop index weightings including sales, cash flow, dividends and book value.
 In November 2017, Betashares and Coolabah Capital Investments (CCI) released Australia's first Active ETF investing in a managed, diversified portfolio of hybrid securities. The portfolio manager for the Betashares Active Australian Hybrids Fund (managed fund) is Christopher Joye.
 In December 2017, Betashares and global asset manager Legg Mason, one of the world's largest active investment management firms, entered a strategic partnership to launch the Betashares Legg Mason Equity Income Fund (managed fund) and Betashares Legg Mason Real Income Fund (managed fund). In November 2018, they launched Australia's first Active Fixed Income ETF, the Betashares Legg Mason Australian Bond Fund. In June 2019, they launched their fourth active fund, the Betashares Legg Mason Emerging Markets Fund.

See also 
 List of Australian exchange-traded funds
 Exchange-traded fund
 Gold exchange-traded fund

References 

Australian companies established in 2009
Financial services companies of Australia
Financial services companies established in 2009
Companies based in Sydney
Exchange-traded funds
2011 mergers and acquisitions